In functional programming, filter is a higher-order function that processes a data structure (usually a list) in some order to produce a new data structure containing exactly those elements of the original data structure for which a given predicate returns the boolean value true.

Example
In Haskell, the code example

 filter even [1..10]

evaluates to the list 2, 4, …, 10 by applying the predicate even to every element of the list of integers 1, 2, …, 10 in that order and creating a new list of those elements for which the predicate returns the boolean value true, thereby giving a list containing only the even members of that list. Conversely, the code example
 filter (not . even) [1..10]

Visual example 

Below, you can see a view of each step of the filter process for a list of integers X = [0, 5, 8, 3, 2, 1] according to the function :

This is the predicate.

Language comparison
Filter is a standard function for many programming languages, e.g.,
Haskell,
OCaml,
Standard ML,
or Erlang.
Common Lisp provides the functions remove-if and remove-if-not.
Scheme Requests for Implementation (SRFI) 1 provides an implementation of filter for the language Scheme.
C++ provides the algorithms remove_if (mutating) and remove_copy_if (non-mutating); C++11 additionally provides copy_if (non-mutating). Smalltalk provides the select: method for collections. Filter can also be realized using list comprehensions in languages that support them.

In Haskell, filter can be implemented like this:
 filter :: (a -> Bool) -> [a] -> [a]
 filter _ []     = []
 filter p (x:xs) = [x | p x] ++ filter p xs

Here, [] denotes the empty list, ++ the list concatenation operation, and [x | p x] denotes a list conditionally holding a value, x, if the condition p x holds (evaluates to True).

Variants
Filter creates its result without modifying the original list. Many programming languages also provide variants that destructively modify the list argument instead for faster performance. Other variants of filter (e.g., Haskell dropWhile and partition) are also common. A common memory optimization for purely functional programming languages is to have the input list and filtered result share the longest common tail (tail-sharing).

See also
 Map (higher-order function)
 List comprehension
 Guard (computing)

References

Higher-order functions
Articles with example Haskell code